Great Ayton Friends' School (1841–1997)  in Great Ayton, North Yorkshire, England, was an independent, co-educational, agricultural boarding school, run by the Religious Society of Friends (the Quakers).

The River Leven (a tributary of the River Tees), ran through the school grounds and was bridged in several places.

History

Quakers in County Durham, having concern for children of disowned Friends who were not eligible for Quaker education, were searching for a suitable site to establish an agricultural school on their behalf.  Unable to find a site in the preferred area of Bishop Auckland, Durham Friends sought the assistance of Thomas Richardson, a Quaker from Darlington  who had come to live in Great Ayton on his retirement in 1830.

In 1841 the school was established "for the maintenance of 36 boys and the same number of girls belonging to or connected with the Society of Friends; others are admitted at a charge representing about the average cost of each child per annum.  There was now accommodation for 80 boarders.  The course of instruction embraces Latin, French, Euclid, Geometry, Algebra, and various scientific subjects: Agriculture, Chemistry, Physiology, Botany, etc.  The girls are trained either for domestic work or a higher sphere of life". George Dixon was the first superintendent of the Quaker School, he also started a botanical class in the village for local residents, including lichenologist William A. Mudd, (1829-1879).

Disownment  for 'marrying out' ended in 1854, and the school changed with the times, becoming the Friends' School.

From 1935 to 1942 the school hosted nearly 40 refugees from the Nazi regime.

The school gradually attracted greater numbers of pupils until there was no room large enough to contain all of the 300 pupils.  In 1968 the Meeting House was enlarged to accommodate the complete student body.

In 1991 the school adopted a more commercial approach.  It dropped its named association with the Quakers and adopted the new name 'Ayton School'.  It appointed a marketing manager to promote the school's facilities to the general public, a move that signalled hard times were around the corner.

The closure of the school in 1997 came as a shock and bereavement to the Quakers, the villagers of Great Ayton and the staff and pupils at the school.  Dwindling pupil numbers had given the trustees no other option but to close the school at the end of the term.  In a letter to parents, chairman Robert Campbell explained that 37 of the school's 200 pupils had withdrawn from the school recently leaving the school massively short of funds.

The school's 28 teachers and 22 other staff lost their jobs and the school's grade II listed building and its  estate were put up for sale.

During its 157-year history the school was attended by almost 7,500 pupils and employed 550 staff.

Present

The Friends school estate was sold to Wimpey Homes.  Working with English Heritage and The Georgian Society, the company established a development with attempted sympathy to the local style and to the surrounding architecture.  Many of the school's original features have been retained and the local wildlife and landscapes have been carefully managed.

Wimpey built 63 properties on the grounds.  The styles vary from the farmhouse family homes, to cottages and traditional three-storey town houses.

In the Richardson School Hall, 21 apartments were sold, ranging in price from £120,000 to £200,000.

The Quakers in Great Ayton set aside part of the meeting house as an 'Old Scholars' room containing many items selected by Old Scholars to be retained as mementoes of the School.  The War Memorial plaque from the School dining room is placed there while the memorial benches remain in the meeting room.

References

Further reading
G. Alston Watson; 'Ayton School Centenary History' 1841-1941.Headley Bros, 1941.

External links
 Ayton Old Scholars
 Ayton School, photographs of Great Ayton
 

Grade II listed buildings in North Yorkshire
Quaker schools in England
Grade II listed educational buildings
Educational institutions established in 1841
Educational institutions disestablished in 1997
Defunct schools in North Yorkshire
1841 establishments in England
1997 disestablishments in England